Karl Schneider was a Swiss footballer who played for FC Basel. He played in the position as  defender.

Between the years 1899 and 1901 Schneider played a total of 25 games for Basel without scoring a goal. Seven of these games were in the Swiss Serie A, and 18 were friendly games. In the 1899–1900 season FC Basel did not play competitive football. He was called Schneider (II) and was the team captain in their 1900–01 season.

Sources and references
 Rotblau: Jahrbuch Saison 2017/2018. Publisher: FC Basel Marketing AG. 
 Die ersten 125 Jahre. Publisher: Josef Zindel im Friedrich Reinhardt Verlag, Basel. 
 Verein "Basler Fussballarchiv" Homepage

FC Basel players
Swiss men's footballers
Association football defenders